The major Hindu temples in Pakistan are Shri Hinglaj Mata temple (whose annual Hinglaj Yatra is the largest Hindu pilgrimage in Pakistan, which is participated by more than 250,000 pilgrims), Shri Ramdev Pir temple (whose annual Ramdevpir Mela in the temple is the second largest Hindu pilgrimage in Pakistan, Umarkot Shiv Mandir (famous for its annual Shivrathri festival, which is one of the biggest religious festivals in Pakistan, and the Churrio Jabal Durga Mata Temple (famous for Shivrathri celebrations which is attended by 200,000 pilgrims).

Pakistan Administered Kashmir

Bhimber District
 Shiv Temple at Barnala

Kotli District
 Banganga Temple at Khuiratta
 Hindu Temples at Kotli City

Mirpur District
 Baba Balaji Temple at Ratta, Dadyal
 Raghunath Temple at Mangla Dam Lake 
 Shivala Temple, at Mangla Dam Lake

Muzaffarabad District
 Sita Ram Temple at Muzaffarabad City

Neelum District
Sharada Peeth at Sharda

Poonch District
Mandhol Sun Temple at Mandhole

Balochistan

Lasbela District
 Shri Hinglaj Mata temple is located in Hingol National Park. The shrine of the Goddess Hinglaj is located in the desert of Balochistan, Pakistan, about 215 kilometers west of the city of Karachi. The annual Hinglaj Yatra is the largest Hindu pilgrimage in Pakistan, which is participated by more than 250,000 pilgrims.
Baba Chandragup is a mud volcano. It is an important stop for pilgrims on their way to the shrine of Shri Hinglaj Mata temple. The volcano is considered as the embodiment of Lord Shiva.

Dera Bugti District
Marrhi Mandir at Dera Bugti

Harnai District
Agrasen Maharaj Temple, Harnai
Shiva Temple, Harnai

Kachhi District
Sant Madhoo Das Temple at Bhag Tehsil. 
Banke Bihari Mandir, Chalgari

Kalat District
Kalat Kali Mata Temple at Kalat

Khuzdar District
Ramdev Ji Mandir , Gajozai
ISKCON centre, Khuzdar

Loralai District
Sanatan Dharm Mandir

Mastung District
Shiva Mandir at Mastung.It has a tree with three branches representing Brahma, Vishnu and Mahesh.
Kalka Mata Mandir at Mastung

Nasirabad District
Ram Mandir, Nuttal 
Bhagwan Vishnu Sthanam , Dera Murad Jamali

Quetta District
Arya Samaj Temple at Quetta
Bhagat Chuharmal Temple at Quetta
Krishna Temple at Quetta
Sidh Pani Nath Ji Temple at Mirri Fort
ISKCON centre, Quetta

Sibi District
Sibi Mandir
Tili Van Mandir
Pooja Mata Mandir at Lehri

Zhob District
Hindu temple, Zhob
Arya Samaj Temple, Zhob

Islamabad
Rama Temple at Saidpur village
Krishna Temple at Islamabad
Temple at Raval Dam

Khyber Pakhtunkhwa

Abbottabad District
Araya Temple at Nawanshehr Area 
Krishna Temple 
Tramsal Temple in Jarral

Dera Ismail Khan District
Balmik Mandir at Jogianwala Mohallah
Hindu Temple at Bilot
Kafir Kot Temples at Kafir Kot
Kali Mata Temple at Topanwala Chowk

Haripur District
Bara Dari Temple at Sarai Saleh
Gurdwara & Ganesh Mandir at Haripur City
Krishna Temple at Main Bazar
Maa Shairan Wali Temple at Main Bazar
Shiv Mandir at Rehmania Bazar

Karak District
Shri Paramhans Dayal Ji Maharaj at Teri

Kohat District
 Valmiki Mandir

Malakand District
 Valmiki Mandir at Dargai

Mansehra District
Bareri Mata/Durga Temple and Shrine on Bareri Hill, (no longer in regular use but sometimes visited by pilgrims and tourists. The edicts of Ashoka are inscribed on three large boulders nearby.)
Mansehra Shiva Temple at Chitti Gatti

Mardan District
Laxmi Narain Mandir
Guides Infantry Temple at Hoti

Nowshera District
Shiv Mandir

Peshawar District
Asamai Temples Complex at Asamai Gate 
Balmiki Mandir at Kalibari
Dargah Pir Ratan Nath at Jhanda Bazaar
Gorakh Nath Temple at Gor Khatri
Gurudwara Bhai Joga Singh at Qissa Khawani Bazaar
Kalibari Mandir at Kalibari
Nandi Mandir
Panj Tirath at Hashtnagri
Valmiki Temple at R.A.Bazar 
Wangri Garan Temple at Hashtnagri

Swat District
Vishnu temple

Punjab

Attock District
Baradari Temple at Attock Khurd
Hari Temple at Hazro 
Shiva Temple at Fateh Jang
Krishna Temple at Fateh Jang
Old Temple at Attock Khurd

Bahawalpur District
Kala Dhari Mandir

Bahawalnagar District
Govinda Mandir , Minchanabad

Rahim Yar Khan District
Krishna Temple, Sadiqabad
Sidhi Vinayak Temple, Bhong

Bhakkar District
Old Sheraan Wala Temple at Main Bazar
Shri Mahavir Ji Temple at Mankera

Chakwal District
Katasraj Temple at choa saidanshah
Malkana Temple at Dalwal
Malot Temple at Malot
Old Hindu Temple at Dhurnal
SatGhara at Katas Village
Sassi Da Kallara at Talagang

Chiniot District
Bara Mandir was built by Maharaja Gulab Singh.
Mandir at Moza Suliaman
kartari lal mandir(inside Lahori gate)

Dera Ghazi Khan District
shiv mandir

Faisalabad District
Hanuman Mandir at Ashrafabad
Sita-Ram Temple at Jhang Bazar Chowk

Gujranwala District
Sheetla Mata Mandir at Sohdra 
Devi Wala Talaab at Mohalla Pondawala
Loria Temple at Clock Tower Road
Shiv Temple at Nuinke
AatmaRam Temple, Gujranwala :  It is the Samadhi of  Jain Archarya Vijayanandsuri  at Bakhtay Wala 
Jain Temple at Rasool Nagar
Tomri Sahib Temple at Badoki Gusaian
Kamleshvar Mahadev Mandir 
Babraya wala Mandir

Gujrat District
Old Temple at Sook Kalan
Sun Temple at Qilladar

Hafizabad District
Guru Nanik Temple at Kaleke

Jhang District
Bawalal nath mandir
Massan mandir

Jhelum District
Hindu Temple at Mirzabad
Hindu Temple at Rohtas Fort
Hindu Temple at Tilla Jogian
Shiva Temple at Bagh Mohalla

Kasur District
 Darbar Baba Lal Shahbaz Qalandar at Raja Jang
 Baba Ram Thaman Shrine

Khanewal District
Hindu Temple at Mian Channun
Sita Kund Mandir at Kabirwala
Lachman Chotra  at Kabirwala
Ram Chotra at Kabirwala

Khushab District
Amb Shareef Temple in Sakesar

Lahore District

Basuli Hanuman Temple at Anarkali Bazaar
Bhadrakali Temple, Lahore at Gulzar Colony
Bhairav Ka Asthan at Ichhra
Hudiara Temple at Hudiara
Jain Temple at Garhi Shahu
Krishna Temple at Ravi Road, Qasurpura
Lava Temple at Lahore Fort
Rattan Chand Temple at Anarkali Bazaar
Satti Temple at Manhala
Shiv Temple at Model Town
Shri 1008 Bhagwan Adinath Jain Temple at Anarkali Bazaar, Jain Mandir Chowk
Sitla Temple at Mohalla Chiri Maran
Valmiki Temple at Anarkali Bazaar
Ganga Ram Samadhi

Layyah District
Mae Mata Temple at Layyah

Lodhran District
Hindu Temple at Danwaran

Mandi Bahauddin District
shiva temple

Mianwali District
Mari Temple near Kalabagh at Mari Indus

Multan District
Aditya Sun Temple at Suraj Kund
Balmiki Temple (Valmiki) at Multan
Hindu Temple at Bukhari Colony
Mandir Jain Sweatamber at Inner City
Mandir Shah Majeed at Inner City
Sri Narasimha Temple at Prahladpuri
Old Shiva Temple, Near Multan

Muzaffargarh District
 krishna temple

Nankana Sahib District
Sikh Temple at Nankana Sahib

Narowal District
Bhairavnath Temple at Zafarwal
Hindu temple in Zafarwal
Durga Mandir at Darman, Shakargarh
Hindu Temple at Farooq Gunj Mohalla
Shiva Temple at Sukhochak
Krishna Temple at Sukhochak
Digambar Jain Temple in Narowal

Okara District
Hindu Temple at Depalpur

Pakpattan District
Parnami Temple at Malka Hans

Rajanpur district
 krishna temple

Rawalpindi District
Shri Krishna Temple at Saddar in Rawalpindi city
Valmiki Mandir, Rawalpindi
Ambardaran Temple at Bohar Bazar
Bagh Sardaran Temple Complex at Ghazni Colony
Ganesha Temple, Landa Bazar at
Ganj Mandi Hindu Temple at Raja Bazar
Hindu Temple at Kahuta
Jandial Temple at Taxila (Zoroastrianism)
Kalyan Das Temple at Kohati Bazar
Krishna Temple at Purana Qila
Lal Kurti Temple at Lalkurti
Madanpura Temple at Gawal Mandi
Sagri Temple at Saagri

Sahiwal District
 shiva mandir

Sargodha District
Baoliwala Temple at Bhera
Dahram Temple at Bhalwal
Gulabgarh Temple at Bhera
Hindu Temple at Bhera
Hindu Temple in Sheesh Mahalat, Bhera
Shiv Temple at Bhera

Sheikhupura District
 Hindu temple at Pind Mirowal Moridke

Sialkot District
Jagannath Temple at Hassanpura, Sialkot
Hindu Temple at Qila Kalar Wala
Mata Katyani Temple at Kakran
Puran Bhagat Temple at Rasulpur Road
Raghunath Temple, Sialkot at Gurr Mandi Bazar
Shivala Teja Singh temple at Kashmiri Mohalla

Toba Tek Singh District
Sri Sanatam Dharm Sabha Mandir

Vehari District
 Shiva Mandir

Sindh

Temples in Sindh province:

Badin District
Shiv mandir

Dadu District
Gorakh Hill of Gorakhnath
Shiva Mandir Johi at Johi
Veernath Temple at Khairpur Nathan Shah

Ghotki District
Raharki Sahib at Raharki 5 km away from Daharki (Pakistan's biggest Hindu temple)
Shadani Darbar at Mirpur Mathelo
Hanuman Mandir at Mirpur Mathelo
Shri Krishna Mandir Aanand Dham, Devri road, Ghotki

Hyderabad District
ISKCON Hyderabad, Sindh
Shiv temple, Hyderabad
Durga Shiv Mandir at Circuit House
Maa Kali Mandir
SSD Dham Mandir at Shahi Bazar

Jacobabad District
Baba Kalyan Dass Mandir 
Bhagwan Shiv Mandir at Ladies Market
Lal Sain Mandir at Bhahan Bazar
Nandro Mata Waro Mandir at Chenchri Ghitti
Sach Khand Dham
Shive shankar Mandir at Peti Bazar
Swami Kirshan Gir Darbar (Kundan Gir Marri)

Jamshoro District
Bhole Shankar Mandir at Kotri
Daharan Tirth at Lakki hills
Gobindram Darbar at Manjhand
Hanuman Mandir at Kotri
Kathwari Harijan Manhar Mandir near Nooriabad in Thana Bulla Khan
Guru Mangal Gir Temple in Thana Bulla Khan
Guru Balpuri Ashram in Thana Bulla Khan

Karachi District
Bhagnari Shiv Mandir at Kakri Ground or Lyari Town
Darya Lal Sankat Mochan Mandir (also called Jhoolay Lal Mandir) at Custom House
Devi Mandir at Bombay Bazar
Guru Nanak Gurudwara at Karachi City
Hanuman Mandir at Doli Khata
Hanuman Mandir at Frere Road
Hinglaj Mata Mandir (also called Jagannath Akhra Mandir) at Bhimpura
ISKCON Karachi
Malir Mandir at Shah Faisal Town
Manhar Mandir Kathwari Mandir at Rancho Line
Mari Mata Mandir Rattan Tallow Akbar Road at Saddar
Mata Mandir at Doli Khata
Narsingh Mahadev Mandir at Risala
Naval Mandir at Ranchore Lines is a 200 sq yards pale yellow stone walled temple with polished marble surfaces and clay statues of Santoshi Mata, Kali Mata, Vishnu, Shiva, Ganesha, Hanuman, Guru Nanak and Rama and Nandi where Holi and Diwali are celebrated.
Pamwal Das Shiv Mandir at Lyari Town.
Panchmukhi Hanuman Temple at Soldier Bazar, is 1500 years old and houses a 2.5m tall statue of lord Hanuman. Renovation of the temple commenced in 2012 and it is popular among Maharashtrian, Sindhi and Balochi devotees. Half of the temple's 2,609 square feet of land has been encroached upon by Muslims, The temple has won back four of six small plots after the lease was cancelled by a district court and is still fighting to reclaim two remaining plots.

Parsi Fire Temple at Saddar Karachi
Ramchandra Mandir at Saddar
Ramswamy Mandir at Ramswamy
Shankar Bhole Nath Mandir at Mauripur
Sheetala Mata Mandir at Bhimpura
Shiv Mandir at Islamia Science College
Shree Radha Gokul Anand Temple at Rangiwara
Shree Ram Dev Pir Mandir at Sadder town near Cantt Railway Station
Shri Guru Nanak Darbar at Manora
Shri Guru Nanak Satsang Sabha at Aram Bagh
Shri Hanuman Mandir at Jinnah Post Graduate Medical Centre
Shri Hanuman Mandir at Karachi Cantonment 
Shri Laxmi Narayan Mandir at Native Jetty area 
Shri Mari Amman Temple at JPMC F/Type
Shri Mari Maata Mandir at Korangi Town
Shri Punch Mukhi Hanuman Mandir at Garden East
Shri Ramdev Shiv Santosh Temple at Drigh Road
Shree Ratneshwar Mahadev Mandir at Clifton
Shri Swaminarayan Mandir
Shri Varun Dev Mandir at Manora beach

Kashmore District
Baba Garib Das Darbar at Gospur, Kandhkot
Shri Guru Tegh Bahadur Sahib (Gurudwara) at Kandhkot
Prem Prakash Aashram at Kandhkot
Samadha Dham at Kandhkot

Khairpur District
Jhulay Lal Temple at Hindu Mohalla, Choondiko
ISKCON centre at Thari Mirwah

Larkana District
ISKCON Larkana
Chidakashi darbar Temple, Karma bagh
Krishna temple
Shivala temple

Matiari District
Jhulelal Mandir at Oderolal Village

Mirpur Khas District
Shiv Temple at Laghari
Naon Nath Asthan Digri
Lal shiv mandir
Shiv Temple at Heerabad
Shiv temple Malhi Goth (Baghat)
Kot ghulam Muhammad

Naushahro Feroze District
Darbar Sahib at Halani

Qambar Shahdadkot District
Baba Hiradaram Mandir 
Baba Khat Wala Shahib Mandir
Guru Nanik Dass Mandir
Qambar Darbar at Qambar
Shiv Mandir

Sanghar District
Khori Darbar mandir at khipro 
Rato Kot Mandir at Sanghar
Sai Pursna Ram Darbar at Hathongo
Shri Shyam Dam Mandir, north of Baqar Khan Nizamani and west of Shahdadpur

Sujawal District
Shiv Mandir at Takanu in Jati Sujawal

Shikarpur District
Hanuman Mandir at Shikarpur
Khat Wari Darbar at Shikarpur
Samadha Ashram at Shikarpur
Shankaranand Bharti at Shikarpur
Bhaghwan Valmiki Mandir, Saddar, Shikarpur
Lal Mandir, Shikarpur

Sukkur District
ISKCON Sukkur
Baba Khushi Ram Mandir at Sangrar
Jhulay Lal Mandir at Bagarji, Sukkur
Kalka Cave Temple in Rohri, Sindh is a temple of Kalaratri (Kali), one of the nine forms of Navadurga, believed to have appeared here on her journey to Hinglaj in Balochistan.

Sadh Belo Island Temple
Wasan Shah Darbar at Rohri
kali Mata mandir

Tando Allahyar District
Ramapir Temple Tando Allahyar

Tando Muhammad Khan District
Shiv mandir

Tharparkar District

Sant Nenuram Ashram in Islamkot
Anchlasar at Nagarparkar
Lakhan Bharti Temple at Nagarparkar
Baba Ramdev Mandir at Kasbo
Chamunda Shakti Mandir at Chelhar
Jain Temple at Bhodesar
Mata Rani Bhatiyani Temple at Nagarparkar
Parbrahm Ashram at Diplo
Pithoro Pir Mandir at Chelhar
Ramdev Peer Temple at Mithi
Ramdev Temple at Ikraro Bheel, Nagarparkar
Sachya Mataji at Nagarparkar
Shani Dev Mandir at Chelhar
Shiv Temple at Sardharo
Shive and Pithoro Temple at Pabuhar
Shri Devi Mata Mandir at Chelhar
Shri Murli Mandir at Chelhar
Shri Ramapi Mandir at Chelhar
Shiv Mandir at Chelhar
Lokesh Mandir at Mithi
Shantoshi Maa Mandir at Mithi
Shri Ganesh Mandir at Mithi
Shri Hanuman Mandir at Mithi
Shri Krishna Mandir at Mithi
Shri Murlidhar Mandir at Mithi
Shiv Parvati Mandir at Mithi
Shri Pir Pithoro Mandir at Mithi
Shri Ramapir Mandir at Mithi
Pooj Parbat Gir Goswami Mandir at Mithi
Churrio Jabal Durga Temple at Nangarparkar
Guri Mandir at Guri
Krishna Mandir at Kantio
Nagarparkar Temples at Nagarparkar

Thatta District
Baba Srichand Darbar
Guru Nanak Saheb at Mirpur Bathoro
Hanuman Mandir at Cinema road
Jhule Lal Mandir Behrani at Goth
Jhule Lal Mandir at Main Shahi Bazar
Jhule Lal Mandir in a house at Sonara Bazar
Makli Temple at Makli
Mata Singh Bhawani Mandir at Makli
Nath Marhi Mandir
Seetla Mata Mandir in a house at Sonara Bazar
Shiv Mandir at Maheshwari Mohala
Shree Mamai Dev Ashthan at Makli

Umerkot District
Aasmaniyan Ro Thaan at Umarkot
Dado Khetaram Mandir at Pithoro
Dargh Pir Pithoro at Pithoro
Kali Mata Temple
Krishna Mandir at old Amarkot
Mandir at Cheelh
Ramdev Mandir at Goth Jafar Khan Dal
Umarkot Shiv Mandir at old Amarkot
Shri Muralidhar Mandir at Umarkot
Shri Rattan Gir Goswami Mandir at Umarkot
Majisa Batyani and Dado Sawai Singh Rathor Thaan (Dori Than) near moti chowk Amarkot

Threats 
A survey carried out by All Pakistan Hindu Rights Movement Pakistan's revealed that out of 428 Hindu temples in Pakistan that existed before Partition, only around 20 survive today and they remain neglected by the Evacuee Trust Property Board which controls those, while the rest had been converted for other uses. Nearly 1000 active and former Hindu temples were attacked in 1992 riots and in other attacks like the 2014 Larkana temple attack, 2019 Ghotki riots, and the 2020 Karak temple attack. Idols in some temples in Pakistan have gone missing and the ponds outside those temples that are considered necessary for a holy dip are drying up due to neglect, which has irked the Supreme Court of Pakistan. However, some of the closed temples have been reopened following the Court rulings, and government intervention.

See also
 Hinduism in Pakistan
 List of Shiva Temples in Pakistan
 Lists of Hindu temples by country
 Hindu marriage laws in Pakistan
 Minorities in Pakistan
 Pakistan Hindu Council
 Persecution of Hindus in Pakistan
 Religious discrimination in Pakistan

References
Notelist

Further reading
 Arun Shourie and Sita Ram Goel, 1990, Hindu Temples: What Happened to Them"
 Anthony Gordon O'Brien, 1996, The Ancient Chronology of Thar: The Bhāṭṭika, Laukika, and Sindh Eras
 Reema Abbasi, 2014, Historic Temples in Pakistan: A Call to Conscience

 Citations

01
Hindu temples
Pakistan